Amla Junction railway station is a main railway station in Betul district, Madhya Pradesh. Its code is AMLA. It serves Amla city. The station consists of six platforms.

Amla Junction is on broad-gauge lines which connects to Itarsi in the north, Nagpur in the southeast and Chhindwara in the east.

Trains 
 Andaman Express
 Gomti Sagar Express
 Chhattisgarh Express
 Panchvalley Passenger
 Deekshabhoomi Express
 Patalkot Express (via Amla)
 Nagpur–Rewa Superfast Express
 Jaipur–Secunderabad Express
 Amla–Betul Passenger
 Betul–Chhindwara Passenger
 Itarsi–Nagpur Passenger
 Amla–Chhindwara Passenger
 Amla–Nagpur Passenger
 Dakshin Express
 Gorakhpur–Secunderabad Express
 Amravati–Jabalpur Superfast Express
 Ahilyanagari Express
 Dr. Ambedkar Nagar–Nagpur Superfast Express
 Dadadham Intercity Express (via Itarsi)
 Gorakhpur–Yesvantpur Express
 Bhusaval–Hazrat Nizamuddin Gondwana Superfast Express
 Hazrat Nizamuddin–Raigarh Gondwana Superfast Express
 Thiruvananthapuram Swarna Jayanti Express 
 Grand Trunk Express
 Raptisagar Express
 Indore–Nagpur Tri Shatabdi Express
 Visakhapatnam–Hazrat Nizamuddin Link Superfast Express

References

Railway stations in Betul district
Nagpur CR railway division
Railway junction stations in Madhya Pradesh